Olli Wilhelm (Ville) Korhonen (12 May 1877, Nilsiä – 6 September 1931) was a Finnish schoolteacher and politician. He was a member of the Parliament of Finland from 1919 to 1922, representing the Social Democratic Party of Finland (SDP).

References

1877 births
1931 deaths
People from Nilsiä
People from Kuopio Province (Grand Duchy of Finland)
Social Democratic Party of Finland politicians
Members of the Parliament of Finland (1919–22)
Finnish schoolteachers